"The Cigar Store Indian" is the 74th episode of the NBC sitcom Seinfeld. It is the tenth episode of the fifth season, and first aired on December 9, 1993. In this episode, Jerry has troubles with appearing racially insensitive in front of a Native American woman he is attracted to, while Elaine is bothered by a lovestruck TV enthusiast who she met on the subway.

Plot
After visiting the Costanzas' house, Elaine and Kramer must take the subway home since their ride, Jerry, is helping George with a coffee table stain. She takes a TV Guide with Al Roker on the cover as reading material. Elaine and Kramer are separated on the subway when Kramer stops to get a gyro. Elaine forgets the TV Guide on her seat and it is obtained by an amorous TV enthusiast, who cuts it up to make a bouquet for her.

Jerry presents Elaine with a cigar store Indian as a peace offering for making her take the subway, in large part to show off his generous side to Elaine's friend Winona. Winona becomes offended and walks out when Jerry rocks it back and forth while mimicking Native American chants, after which an irate Elaine informs Jerry that Winona is Native American. Elaine gives the cigar store Indian to Kramer, who believes he can make a bundle selling it. He has an idea for a coffee table book about coffee tables and asks her to mention it to her boss, Mr. Lippman, but Elaine says it is a dumb idea. Jerry apologizes to Winona and smooths things over enough to get a date with her. He asks a postman for directions to the nearest Chinese restaurant; the postman attributes Jerry's asking to the fact that he is Chinese, and Winona walks out again, convinced of his racial insensitivity. Kramer suddenly appears in a taxi with the cigar store Indian, yelling at Jerry and placing his hand on his mouth to mimic Native American calls, further offending Winona.  

George meets a woman at a furniture refinishing store and takes her to his parents' home, where they have sex. His parents discover his prophylactic wrapper in their bed and the absence of Frank's TV Guide and ground him, despite George being in his mid-30s.

Jerry again smooths things over with Winona, but is so afraid of appearing insensitive again that he even avoids referring to their restaurant arrangements as "reservations" or that he got Knick tickets from a "scalper". Winona lets him have her copy of the Roker TV Guide to give to Frank. Elaine takes it to the Costanzas' house, where the TV enthusiast from the subway tracked her by reading the postal address. Frank is dissatisfied with the TV Guide, since the cover was stained by tzatziki sauce from the gyros Elaine was eating, and yells at her. The TV enthusiast comes to her defense and inadvertently knocks the refinished coffee table over. Winona insists on having the TV Guide back. When Jerry says it is too late, he struggles to avoid calling her an Indian giver, and she breaks up with him in response.

While trying to sell the cigar store Indian to a cigar dealer, Kramer meets Mr. Lippman, who offers to buy it for $500. Kramer helps Lippman carry it to his office, where Kramer pitches his coffee table book. Lippman is intrigued and reprimands Elaine for not coming up with such ideas.

Estelle takes the coffee table to the same furniture store George took it to. She runs into the woman George had sex with and reveals the truth about George. Elaine and Jerry take the subway to Queens to give Frank the Roker TV Guide (which they had to order). They are separated when Jerry runs to get a gyro. Al Roker himself gets on the train and becomes interested in Elaine.

Production
Tom Gammill and Max Pross's original draft for the episode was called "The Moose Head"; in this version, Jerry buys Elaine a moose head, and Winona is offended by the gift because she is an animal rights activist. Show creators Larry David and Jerry Seinfeld felt the moose head was too reminiscent of sitcoms from decades past, and directed Gammill and Pross to replace it with something more politically incorrect.

According to Pross, the incident with the Chinese postman was taken "almost verbatim" from his real life. While walking through Chinatown late at night, Pross asked a postman if he knew of a Chinese restaurant that was still open, and the postman started screaming at him, thinking Pross assumed he knew where the restaurants were because he was Chinese rather than because he was a postman.

References

External links

Seinfeld (season 5) episodes
1993 American television episodes
TV Guide